New Rome is an unincorporated community in Sibley County, Minnesota, United States, near Arlington.  The community is located along Sibley County Road 9 (411th Avenue) near 280th Street.  New Rome is located within Arlington Township and Kelso Township.  State Highway 19 (MN 19) is nearby.

References

Unincorporated communities in Sibley County, Minnesota
Unincorporated communities in Minnesota